Dodds is a ghost town in Woodbury County, in the U.S. state of Iowa.

History
Dodds contained a post office between 1877 and 1886.

References

Geography of Woodbury County, Iowa